Corinna Schwab (born 5 April 1999) is a German athlete. She competed in the women's 400 metres event at the 2021 European Athletics Indoor Championships.

References

External links
 

1999 births
Living people
German female sprinters
People from Schwandorf (district)
Sportspeople from the Upper Palatinate
Athletes (track and field) at the 2020 Summer Olympics
Olympic athletes of Germany
Olympic female sprinters
Athletes (track and field) at the 2019 European Games
European Games medalists in athletics
European Games bronze medalists for Germany